The Intel 80186, also known as the iAPX 186, or just 186, is a microprocessor and microcontroller introduced in 1982. It was based on the Intel 8086 and, like it, had a 16-bit external data bus multiplexed with a 20-bit address bus. The 80188 variant, with an 8-bit external data bus was also available.

Description
The 80186 series was generally intended for embedded systems, as microcontrollers with external memory. Therefore, to reduce the number of integrated circuits required, it included features such as clock generator, interrupt controller, timers, wait state generator, DMA channels, and external chip select lines.

The initial clock rate of the 80186 was 6 MHz, but due to more hardware available for the microcode to use, especially for address calculation, many individual instructions completed in fewer clock cycles than on an 8086 at the same clock frequency. For instance, the common register+immediate addressing mode was significantly faster than on the 8086, especially when a memory location was both (one of) the operand(s) and the destination. Multiply and divide also showed great improvement being several times as fast as on the original 8086 and multi-bit shifts were done almost four times as quickly as in the 8086.

A few new instructions were introduced with the 80186 (referred to as the 8086-2 instruction set in some datasheets): enter/leave (replacing several instructions when handling stack frames), pusha/popa (push/pop all general registers), bound (check array index against bounds), and ins/outs (input/output of string). A useful immediate mode was added for the push, imul, and multi-bit shift instructions. These instructions were also included in the contemporary 80286 and in successor chips.

The (redesigned) CMOS version, 80C186, introduced DRAM refresh, a power-save mode, and a direct interface to the 80C187 floating point numeric coprocessor.  Intel second sourced this microprocessor to Fujitsu Limited around 1985.  Both packages for Intel 80186 version were available in 68-pin PLCC and PGA in sampling at third quarter of 1985.  The available 12.5 MHz Intel 80186-12 version using the 1.5-micron HMOS-III process for USD $36 in quantities of 100.  The available 12.5 MHz Intel 80C186 version using the CHMOS III-E technology using approximately 90 mA under normal load and only 32 mA under power-save mode.  It was available in 68-pin PLCC, CPGA, or CLCC package.

Uses

In personal computers
Because the integrated hardware of the 80186, designed with embedded systems in mind, was incompatible with the hardware used in the original IBM PC, the 80286 was chosen to succeed the 8086, in the IBM PC/AT and other PC-compatible systems.

A few notable personal computers used the 80186: the Australian Dulmont Magnum laptop, one of the first laptops; the Wang Office Assistant, marketed as a PC-like stand-alone word processor; the MAD-1, a semi–IBM PC compatible desktop computer with a modular design; the Pronto System 16, another PC compatible; the Mindset; the Siemens  (not 100% IBM PC compatible but using MS-DOS 2.11); the Compis (a Swedish school computer); the French SMT-Goupil G4; the RM Nimbus (a British school computer); the Unisys ICON (a Canadian school computer); ORB Computer by ABS; the HP 100LX, HP 200LX, HP 1000CX, and HP OmniGo 700LX; the Tandy 2000 desktop (a somewhat PC-compatible workstation with sharp graphics for its day); the Telex 1260 (a desktop PC-XT compatible); the Philips :YES; the Nokia MikroMikko 2; and the IBM PCradio. Acorn created a plug-in for the BBC Master range of computers containing an 80186-10 with 512 KB of RAM, the BBC Master 512 system.

In addition to the above examples of stand-alone implementations of the 80186 for personal computers, there was at least one example of an "add-in" accelerator card implementation: the Orchid Technology PC Turbo 186, released in 1985.  It was intended for use with the original Intel 8088-based IBM PC (Model 5150).

Other devices 
The Intel 80186 is intended to be embedded in electronic devices that are not primarily computers. For example:
 the 80186 was used to control the Microtek 8086 in-circuit emulator
 its offshoot, Intel 80188 was embedded inside the Intel 14.4EX modem released in 1991. The 16 MHz processor was used to perform complex algorithms needed for forward error correction, Trellis modulation, and echo cancellation in the modem
the IBM 7171 protocol converter, which made ASCII character-oriented terminals appear as an IBM 3270 terminal to an IBM mainframe, used the Intel 80186 as its CPU.

In May 2006, Intel announced that production of the 186 would cease at the end of September 2007. Pin- and instruction-compatible replacements might still be manufactured by various third party sources, and FPGA versions are publicly available.

See also
 iAPX, for the iAPX name
 NEC V20/V30, for a third-party CPU also supporting the 80186 instructions

Notes

References

External links
 Intel Datasheet
 Scan of the Intel 80186 data book at datasheetarchive.com
 Intel 80186/80188 images and descriptions at cpu-collection.de
 Chipdb.org

Intel microcontrollers
80186
16-bit microprocessors
X86 microarchitectures